Lombardstown  is a village seven miles west of the town of Mallow in County Cork, Ireland. It takes its name from the Lombard family who came to Ireland from Lombardy in Northern Italy in the Middle Ages and became rich and prominent, with branches of the family in Waterford and Cork. Lombardstown is within the Dáil constituency of Cork North-West.

It has a co-op, a post office and is the site of a Dairygold Agri Business plant.

Notable people

From 1912 the Irish tenor, John McCormack, spent summers in the area after he purchased a small cottage outside the village. In 1918, McCormack sold this cottage due to his singing commitments in the US.

See also
 List of towns and villages in Ireland

References

External links
 Landed Estate Database: Lombard (Lombardstown)

Towns and villages in County Cork